Atik Chihab is a Moroccan footballer. He usually plays as defender. Chihab is currently attached to FAR Rabat.

Chihab played for the FAR Rabat side that won the 2007 Coupe du Trône, the club's ninth, although he scored an own goal in the final against Rachad Bernoussi.

References

1982 births
Living people
Moroccan footballers
Footballers from Casablanca
AS FAR (football) players
Botola players
Association football defenders